The Government of the Macau Special Administrative Region (Portuguese: Governo da R.A.E. de Macau; conventional short name Macau Government, 澳門政府, Governo de Macau), are headed by secretariats or commissioners and report directly to the chief executive. The affairs of the government are decided by secretaries, who are appointed by the chief executive and endorsed by the State Council of the Central People's Government in Beijing. As a special administrative region of China, Macau has a high degree of autonomy, in light of the "One Country, Two Systems" policy. The Macau Government, financially independent from the Central People's Government, oversees the affairs of Macau.

Head of government

The chief executive is responsible for the administration of Macau. The affairs of the government are decided by secretariats, who are appointed by the chief executive and endorsed by the State Council of the Central People's Government in Beijing. The office of chief executive replaced that of governor after 1999 as head of the government in Macau. The chief executive reports to the State Council.

The current chief executive is Ho Iat Seng and Hoi Lai Fong is the chief of the Office of the Chief Executive.

Principal officials
The secretaries are similar to the Hong Kong Government policy bureaux secretaries. However, there are fewer secretaries in Macau, and they are considered part of the civil service instead of officials employed on contracts. The current (fifth) government was inaugurated in December 2019.

The principal officials of the current government are:

 Secretary for Administration and Justice - André Cheong Weng Chon
 Secretary for Economy and Finance - Lei Wai Nong
 Secretary for Security - Wong Sio Chak
 Commissioner General of the Unitary Police Service - Leong Man Cheong
 Director General of the Macao Customs - Vong Man Chong
 Secretary for Social Affairs and Culture - Ao Ieong U
 Secretary for Transport and Public Works - Raimundo Arrais do Rosário
 Commissioner Against Corruption - Chan Tsz King
 Commissioner of Audit - Ho Veng On

Organisation of government
Each secretary leads a number of bureaux, which carry out decisions and plans made by the secretaries.

Pre-1999 government

The structure of the Portuguese administration in Macau was slightly different from the current:

 Governor of Macau as Head of Government
 Secretary for Economic Coordination
 Secretary for Transport and Public Works
 Secretary for Justice
 Secretary for Social Affairs and Budget
 Secretary for Public Administration, Education and Youth
 Secretary for Public Security
 Secretary for Communications, Tourism and Culture

Localisation of key positions was non-existent prior to the handover, all department heads were Portuguese. Chinese civil service heads did not appear until after the establishment of the special administrative region. Currently, many government officials received education in Mainland China, some of them even grew up in China.

Government Information Bureau

The Government Information Bureau (Chinese: 澳門特別行政區政府新聞局 ; Portuguese: Gabinete de Comunicação Social, GCS), commonly known as Macaogcs is the agency responsible for coordinating and studying the social transmission of government of the Macao Special Administrative Region of the People's Republic of China The departments that broadcast and provide assistance to the administrative authorities in this field are directly under the jurisdiction of the chief executive.

See also 

 Government of China
 Government of the Republic of China
 Government of Hong Kong

References

External links 
 Macau SAR Government Portal 
 Political Structure of Macau SAR 
 Casa de Macau - references to former Portuguese secretaries